Dosdall is a surname. Notable people with the surname include:

Cory Dosdall (born 1973), Canadian ice hockey player
Kiira Dosdall (born 1987), American ice hockey player

See also
Dowdall